Earlsheaton was a railway station serving Earlsheaton in West Yorkshire. The station was on the Bradford, Wakefield and Leeds Railway. The station was opened in 1875 on the Great Northern's–– Dewsbury Loop. The line was extended to Batley by 1880.

The station was situated just east of Earlsheaton tunnel which led the railway beneath Sheep Hill. It had two platforms accessed by means of separate footpaths, both of which ultimately led to Earlsheaton Common. Facilities were on the eastbound platform.

The station closed to passengers in June 1953. The line closed altogether in 1965. The station buildings have been demolished and the former trackbed is now a cycle path.

References

Buildings and structures in Dewsbury
Great Northern Railway (Great Britain)
Former Great Northern Railway stations
Railway stations opened in 1875
Railway stations closed in 1953
Railway stations in Great Britain opened in the 19th century